Sean Reycraft is a Canadian screenwriter, television producer and playwright. He is most noted for his theatrical play Pop Song, which won the Floyd S. Chalmers Canadian Play Award in the Youth Theatre division in 2001, and as the screenwriter of Laurie Lynd's 2007 film Breakfast with Scot.

The son of former Ontario MPP Doug Reycraft, he was born and raised in Glencoe. He was an actor in the early 1990s before premiering his first play, Einstein Dreams at Buddies in Bad Times in 1996. His later plays included Reconstruction, The End of Dancing, Roundabout, Strange Things Happen, and One Good Marriage.

He studied film and television writing at the Canadian Film Centre, and has since been a writer and producer on television series such as Braceface, The Eleventh Hour, Degrassi: The Next Generation, Instant Star, Slings & Arrows, The Best Years, 90210, Being Erica, The Vampire Diaries, Switched at Birth, Finding Carter and Killjoys.

He is out as gay.

References

External links

20th-century Canadian dramatists and playwrights
21st-century Canadian dramatists and playwrights
Canadian male dramatists and playwrights
20th-century Canadian screenwriters
Canadian television writers
Canadian television producers
Canadian LGBT dramatists and playwrights
Canadian LGBT screenwriters
LGBT producers
Canadian gay writers
Writers from Ontario
People from Middlesex County, Ontario
Living people
Canadian Film Centre alumni
20th-century Canadian male writers
21st-century Canadian male writers
Canadian male television writers
Year of birth missing (living people)
21st-century Canadian screenwriters
Canadian male screenwriters
Gay screenwriters
Gay dramatists and playwrights
21st-century Canadian LGBT people
20th-century Canadian LGBT people